Indiana State Highway Bridge 42-11-3101, also known as Poland Bridge, is a historic Parker through truss bridge located in Cass Township, Clay County, Indiana.  It was built by the Vincennes Bridge Company and erected in 1939.  It carries State Road 42 over the Eel River.  It measures 175 feet long and rests on a concrete abutment and concrete pier.

It was added to the National Register of Historic Places in 2000.

References

Road bridges on the National Register of Historic Places in Indiana
Bridges completed in 1939
Transportation buildings and structures in Clay County, Indiana
National Register of Historic Places in Clay County, Indiana
Parker truss bridges in the United States